Tyrone Huntley is a British actor, best known for his work in musical theatre.

Career

Early theatre roles included TJ in the UK tour of Sister Act, Doctor in the original London cast of The Book of Mormon and Gator in the original London cast of Memphis.

In summer 2016 he played the role of Judas in Jesus Christ Superstar at the Regent's Park Open Air Theatre. He received great acclaim for his performance and was nominated for both the Whatsonstage Award for Best Supporting Actor in a Musical, and the Laurence Olivier Award for Best Actor in a Musical. He reprised the role in summer 2017.

From November 2016 to June 2017 he played C.C. White in Dreamgirls as part of the original London cast. Huntley left the production in June 2017 to return to his award-winning performance in Jesus Christ Superstar.

In 2019 he directed Ain't Misbehavin' at Southwark Playhouse, a musical revue of the life of Fats Waller. The Guardian  described it as 'an immensely likable romp through the songs of Fats Waller that is an escapist slice of 1920s Harlem" 

Huntley was cast as Barnaby in the 2020 West End revival of Hello, Dolly!  which was to star Imelda Staunton in the title role. The run was cancelled due to the outbreak of COVID-19. He subsequently returned to the role of Judas in a socially distanced concert version of Jesus Christ Superstar at Regent’s Park Open Air Theatre, sharing the role with Ricardo Afonso.

On December 2, 2021, Huntley began reprising the role of Judas in the North American tour of Jesus Christ Superstar following the arrest of previous Judas performer, James D. Beeks, for his involvement in the 2021 United States Capitol attack.

Filmography

Theatre credits

Awards and nominations

References

Living people
Male musical theatre actors
Black British male actors
Male actors from Lincolnshire
1989 births